Daljit Singh (born 15 January 1937) is an Indian former cricketer. He played for several first-class cricket teams in India between 1952 and 1962.

See also
 List of Bengal cricketers

References

External links
 

1937 births
Living people
Indian cricketers
Bengal cricketers
Eastern Punjab cricketers
Jharkhand cricketers
Uttar Pradesh cricketers
Cricketers from Sialkot